Théophile de Viau (159025 September 1626) was a French Baroque poet and dramatist.

Life
Born at Clairac, near Agen in the Lot-et-Garonne and raised as a Huguenot, Théophile de Viau participated in the Huguenot rebellions in Guyenne from 1615–16 in the service of the Comte de Candale. After the war, he was pardoned and became a brilliant young poet in the royal court. Théophile came into contact with the epicurean ideas of Italian philosopher Lucilio Vanini, which questioned the immortality of the soul. (Vanini was accused of heresy and of practising magic, and after having his tongue cut out, was strangled and his corpse burned in Toulouse in 1619.)

Because of his heretical views and his libertine lifestyle, de Viau was banished from France in 1619 and traveled in England, though he returned to the court in 1620.  In 1622 a collection of licentious poems, Le Parnasse satyrique, was published under his name, although many of the poems were written by others. However, de Viau was denounced by the Jesuits in 1623  on moral charges, for his bisexuality. He was imprisoned and sentenced to appear barefoot before Notre Dame in Paris to be burned alive.

While de Viau was in hiding, the sentence was carried out in effigy, but the poet was eventually caught in flight toward England and put in the Conciergerie prison in Paris for almost two years. The trial led to debates among scholars and writers, and 55 pamphlets were published both for and against de Viau. His sentence was changed to permanent banishment and de Viau spent the remaining months of his life in Chantilly under the protection of the Duke of Montmorency before dying in Paris in 1626.

Writings
De Viau's wrote satirical poems, sonnets, odes and elegies. His works include one play, Les Amours tragiques de Pyrame et Thisbé (performed in 1621), the tragic love story of Pyramus and Thisbe which ends in a double suicide.

He wrote Fragment d'une histoire comique (English: Fragment of a Comic Novel, 1623), in which he expressed his literary tastes. He was not a supporter of "the metaphoric excess and lofty erudition" of his contemporaries. But he also thought "sterile" the constraints proposed by would-be reformers such as François de Malherbe. This disregard for constraints probably added to his reputation as a non-conformist.

De Viau's poetic style refused the logical and classicist constraints of François de Malherbe and remained attached to the emotional and the baroque images of the late Renaissance, such as in his ode Un corbeau devant moi croasse (A crow before me caws), which paints a fantastic scene of thunder, serpents and fire (much like a painting by Salvator Rosa). Two of his poems are melancholy pleas to the king on the subject of his incarceration or exile, and this tone of sadness is also present in his ode On Solitide which mixes classical motifs with an elegy about the poet in the midst of a forest.

Théophile de Viau was "rediscovered" by the French Romantics in the 19th century.

Depictions 
He is depicted in Roberto Rossellini's film Descartes as meeting Descartes in the free-thinking salons of Paris before Descartes' departure for Holland in 1618.

References

Sources

 
 
 Dandrey, Patrick, ed. Dictionnaire des lettres françaises: Le XVIIe siècle. Collection: La Pochothèque. Paris: Fayard, 1996.
 Allem, Maurice, ed. Anthologie poétique française: XVIIe siècle.  Paris: Garnier Frères, 1966.
 Oeuvre poétique complete de Théophile de Viau.

External links
  
 English translations of De Viau's poems
 

1590 births
1626 deaths
17th-century French male writers
17th-century French poets
17th-century French novelists
17th-century French dramatists and playwrights
Baroque writers
Bisexual men
French bisexual writers
French letter writers
French satirists
Huguenots
17th-century LGBT people
Sonneteers
French LGBT dramatists and playwrights
French LGBT poets
17th-century letter writers